Ayikkara is one of the 55 divisions of Kannur Municipal Corporation in Kannur district of Kerala state, India. Kannur fort, and the Mappila Bay is near Ayikkara. Sahil Saleem, a notable women's rights activist lives in here.

Local name
The locals call Ayikkara as 'Kannur city' because once it was a downtown area during the Arakkal rule.  The city area is called 'Kannur town'.

Arakkal palace

The remains of the Arakkalkettu, which is the palace of the Arakkal family, is also located in Ayikkara. The Government of Kerala has renovated a part of the Arakkalkettu into a museum. This Arakkal museum is a tourist attraction located in Ayikkara.

Mappila Bay
'Mappila Bay fishing harbour' is located in Ayikkara. There is also a government shrimp hatchery near the harbour. (see: Matsyafed)

Image gallery

See also
 Arakkal Museum
 Arakkal family
 Kannur City

References

Suburbs of Kannur